Luis Hernán Carvallo Muñoz (born 21 September 1949) is a Chilean former footballer and manager.

Managerial career
He worked alongside his brother, Fernando, the most part of his career. In 2007 and 2008 he worked in the Unión Española youth ranks, and next he assumed as the manager of the first team, reaching the 2009 Apertura final versus Universidad de Chile. In 2011, he returned to the Universidad Católica, where he had worked at the beginning of the 1990s, at under-17 level, working alongside .

Personal life
He is the son of 1950 FIFA World Cup player Hernán Carvallo and the younger brother of Fernando Carvallo.

Honours

Club

Player
Universidad Católica
 Primera División de Chile: 1966
 Segunda División de Chile: 1975

Manager
Unión Española
 Primera División de Chile: Runner-up 2009 Apertura

References

1949 births
Living people
Footballers from Santiago
Chilean footballers
Club Deportivo Universidad Católica footballers
Unión Española footballers
Chilean Primera División players
Chilean football managers
Unión Española managers
Chilean Primera División managers
Association football midfielders